Rosa Mística Miño Martínez (born 13 July 1999) is a Paraguayan professional footballer who plays as a midfielder for Brazilian Série A1 club SE Palmeiras and the Paraguay women's national team.

Club career 
She played for the Portuguese club Atlético Ouriense.

After playing in Portugal, she moved to Turkey and signed with the Gaziantep-based league champion club ALG Spor on 15 August 2022.  On 18 August 2022, she debuted in the 2022–23 UEFA Women's Champions League. After capping ib five matches for >ALG Spor, she left Turkey on 29 December 2022.

International career 
Miño represented Paraguay at the 2016 FIFA U-17 Women's World Cup, the 2018 South American U-20 Women's Championship and the 2018 FIFA U-20 Women's World Cup. At senior level, she played the 2018 Copa América Femenina and the 2019 Pan American Games.

References 

1999 births
Living people
Paraguayan women's footballers
Women's association football midfielders
Cerro Porteño players
F.C. Famalicão players
ALG Spor players
Campeonato Brasileiro de Futebol Feminino Série A1 players
Turkish Women's Football Super League players
Paraguay women's international footballers
Pan American Games competitors for Paraguay
Footballers at the 2019 Pan American Games
Paraguayan expatriate women's footballers
Paraguayan expatriate sportspeople in Brazil
Expatriate women's footballers in Brazil
Paraguayan expatriate sportspeople in Portugal
Expatriate women's footballers in Portugal
Paraguayan expatriate sportspeople in Turkey
Expatriate women's footballers in Turkey